Pingba District is a district of the city of Anshun, Guizhou province, China.

Climate

References

County-level divisions of Guizhou